Taydakovo is a village in Yasnogorsky District of Tula Oblast, Russia.

Gallery

References

Rural localities in Tula Oblast